Paletwa is one of the westernmost towns of Myanmar, in Chin State 18 kilometres from the border with Bangladesh. Its population in 2014 was about 97,000.

Demographics 
Rakhine is the Lingua Franca of the region, while Kuki-Chin languages are spoken mostly in the hills. The west of the town hosts many refugees that have fled from Rakhine state. The literacy rate is 65% (2017).

Neighboring villages such as Kan Lay (ကန်းလေ) can be reached only by foot in about an hour.

Connectivity 
Paletwa is connected to the Rakhine state only by boat. It leaves Kyauktaw every morning and reaches Paletwa in the afternoon, running up the Kaladan River.

The road to Matupi is reported to be on the brink of completion. Though, there is no direct evidence of it. 

Paletwa is part of an ongoing infrastructure project Kaladan Multi-Modal Transit Transport Project that will connect it to the Indian state of Mizoram.

Tourism  
Despite its serene natural surroundings, tourism is underdeveloped. The town has one hotel, but due to the restrictions on foreigners and accessibility problems for domestic tourists, tourism is quite difficult to be done at the moment.

References

External links
 Satellite map at Maplandia.com

Township capitals of Myanmar
Populated places in Chin State